Rosa Elena Galván Valles (born 1 July 1949) is a Mexican politician from the National Action Party. In 2009 she served as Deputy of the LX Legislature of the Mexican Congress representing Durango.

References

1949 births
Living people
Politicians from Durango
Women members of the Chamber of Deputies (Mexico)
National Action Party (Mexico) politicians
21st-century Mexican politicians
21st-century Mexican women politicians
Deputies of the LX Legislature of Mexico
Members of the Chamber of Deputies (Mexico) for Durango